Junction Road railway station served the district of Leith, Edinburgh, Scotland from 1869 to 1947 on the Edinburgh, Leith and Granton Line of the North British Railway.

History
The station opened as Junction Road on 1 May 1869 by the North British Railway. It had a double track but a second platform couldn't be built due to space constraints. The signal box was to the southwest. A siding to the northeast served a coal depot. The station closed on 1 January 1917 but reopened on 1 April 1919. Renamed in 1923 as Junction Bridge before closing permanently on 16 June 1947. The signal box closed in 1952.

References

External links
RAILSCOT - Junction Bridge

Disused railway stations in Edinburgh
Former Caledonian Railway stations
Railway stations in Great Britain opened in 1869
Railway stations in Great Britain closed in 1917
Railway stations in Great Britain opened in 1919
Railway stations in Great Britain closed in 1947
1869 establishments in Scotland
1947 disestablishments in Scotland